Core data integration is the use of data integration technology for a significant, centrally planned and managed IT initiative within a company. Examples of core data integration initiatives could include:

 ETL (Extract, transform, load) implementations
 EAI (Enterprise Application Integration) implementations
 SOA (Service-Oriented Architecture) implementations
 ESB (Enterprise Service Bus) implementations

Core data integrations are often designed to be enterprise-wide integration solutions. They may be designed to provide a data abstraction layer, which in turn will be used by individual core data integration implementations, such as ETL servers or applications integrated through EAI.

Because it is difficult to promptly roll out a centrally managed data integration solution that anticipates and meets all data integration requirements across an organization, IT engineers and even business users create edge data integration, using technology that may be incompatible with that used at the core. In contrast to a core data integration, an edge data integration is not centrally planned and is generally completed with a smaller budget and a tighter deadline.

See also
 data integration
 edge data integration

References 
 https://web.archive.org/web/20080310212808/http://searchsoa.techtarget.com/tip/0,289483,sid26_gci1171085,00.html 
 

Data management
Data integration